Crossosoma californicum, known by the common name California rockflower, is one of only a few species in the flowering plant family Crossosomataceae.

Distribution
Crossosoma californicum is native to San Clemente and Santa Catalina Islands, two of the Channel Islands of California, as well as Guadalupe Island off the coast of Baja California.

It is also known from one location on the mainland California coast at the Portuguese Bend Nature Preserve, on the Palos Verdes Peninsula of Los Angeles County.

Description
The stem is intricately divided into many thorn-tipped branches lined with veiny, pale green, oval-shaped to rounded leaves up to 9 centimeters long.

The species produces solitary flowers with round white petals, each one to 1.5 centimeters long. At the center are numerous of stamens and 1-5 free carpels

References

External links
Calflora: Crossosoma californicum (California rockflower)
Jepson Manual Treatment — Crossosoma californicum
Crossosoma californicum — U.C. Photo gallery

Crossosomataceae
Flora of Baja California
Flora of California
Flora of Mexican Pacific Islands
Natural history of the California chaparral and woodlands
Natural history of the Channel Islands of California
Natural history of Los Angeles County, California
Flora without expected TNC conservation status